The Oued Sejenane is a river of Tunisia and Algeria, North Africa.

The Oued Sejenane flows into the Mediterranean near Bizerte and flows past Ichkeul National Park, and the forest of Sajane. It is located at Latitude: 37 ° 10'11.99 "  Longitude: 9 ° 36'47.2 " and is  252 meters above sea level.

References

Sejenane